Knockeyon is a hill in County Westmeath, Ireland in the townland of Streamstown. When viewed from the Ranaghan, and Gillardstown side of the hill, it dominates the surrounding lakes in the countryside of northern County Westmeath.  The chimney of the cement works in Duleek near Drogheda can be seen on a clear day due west, as well as Slieve Gullion in South Armagh and the Mourne Mountains beyond to the north east. The Hills of Mael, Curry and Mullaghmean are viewed from Knockeyon to the north west, and the Cuilcagh Mountains to the north-north-west.

Location
The hill is on the southeastern shore of Lough Derravaragh and oversees much of the north Leinster countryside.

Ancient chapel
The ruins of an ancient chapel (national monument WM012-206 ), said to have been built by one Saint Cauragh and dedicated to Saint Eyon (a corruption of Eóin – St. John the Apostle whose feast day is the third August in the Martyrology of Oengus), are halfway up the hill. A pattern was held annually around 1 August or the nearest Sunday to it. Described in 1682 by Sir Henry Piers of Tristernagh as following:

'This hill hath on that side which hangeth over the water, and about midway from it to the top, an ancient chapel dedicated to a saint, called Eyen or Keyon. This chapel is cut out of the natural rock, for all one side of it appears to be the natural stone instead of a wall. It is now, and long hath been, without a roof: it hath in it a curious purling brook of crystal water (WM012-206001-), which issuing out of the rock side of the chapel, traverseth it, and falling thro' the opposite side wall, hasteneth down to the waters below. To this chapel from the land side leads a pathway on the side of the hill; the nearer you approach to it, the narrower doth the way grow; at last, and at a good distance from it, the way appeareth hewn out of the rock side, rendered easy and safe by the trees, which, as aforesaid, rise from the water, and range over one another, and hem up the way so close, that there is no danger either to slip or fall. To this chapel, on first Sunday in harvest, the natives pay their devotions in pilgrimages, which for certain stages they undertake barefoot; but when they come to a certain noted place in the way, they hold on the remainder of their devotion on their bare knees, all along to the chapel, on stone and gravel, intermixed and overgrown with heath and grass. Their devotions performed, they return merry and shod, no longer concerned for those sins that were the cause of this so severe a penance; but as if, having now paid off the old score, they longed to go on in the new again, they return in all haste to a green spot of ground on the east side of the hill towards the land, and here men and women fall a dancing and carousing the rest of the day; for ale sellers in great numbers on these days have their booths here as in a fair, and to be sure the merry bag-pipers fail not to pay their attendance''' (Vallancey 1786, 12–14). 

In the late 19th century Reverend Cogan (1867, 440) recorded that:'Midway up the hill there is the shell of an old chapel, cut out of the rock, which was dedicated to St. Eyen or Keyon, one of the saints of the early period of our church. A holy well (WM012-206001) is here, one much frequented. The people made pilgrimages to this place on the first Sunday of August, and performed a variety of penitential exercises. Stations were held here, and the neighbouring priests attended to hear confessions, and to prepare the pilgrims for the sacrament of the Eucharist’Annotated as 'Chapel' on the OS maps this structure is situated within a dense hazel and oak historic woodland. Only the footings of this building remain (pers. comm. Aidan Walsh).  Depicted on the 1911 ed. OS 25-inch map as a small rectangular building aligned on a NW-SE axis standing at the intersection point of four woodland pathways.

Habitat
Knockeyon and other surrounding hills support deciduous woodland which mostly consists of native species. Hazel, rowan, ash and oak are abundant. Exotic species occur occasionally, such as horse chestnut and other species introduced including beech.

The neighbouring Knockbody Wood is inhabited by wild pheasant and is a popular attraction for local pheasant hunters. On occasions the Common pochard (Aythya ferina'') population, which is one of the largest in Ireland, has exceeded the threshold for international importance. (i.e. 3,500 individual fowl).

References

External links

 Google Map

Mountains and hills of County Westmeath